
Year 689 (DCLXXXIX) was a common year starting on Friday (link will display the full calendar) of the Julian calendar. The denomination 689 for this year has been used since the early medieval period, when the Anno Domini calendar era became the prevalent method in Europe for naming years.

Events 
 By place 

 Byzantine Empire 
 Byzantine–Bulgarian War: Emperor Justinian II defeats the Bulgars of Macedonia and recaptures Thessalonica, the second most important Byzantine city in Europe. He resettles the subdued Slavs in Anatolia (modern Turkey), where they are required to provide 30,000 men to the Byzantine army.

 Europe 
 Battle of Coronate: The Lombards under King Cunipert defeat the army of Duke Alahis, at the River Adda (Lombardy). He executes the rebel leaders; Alahis is captured and his head and legs are cut off. The southern Lombard duchies take advantage of Cunipert's distraction, and extend their territories. 
 Battle of Dorestad: The Frisians under King Radbod are defeated by the Frankish mayor of the palace, Pippin of Herstal. The Rhine delta and Dorestad (modern Netherlands) become Frankish again, as well as the castles of Utrecht and Fechten (approximate date).

 Asia 
 The Asuka Kiyomihara Code, a collection of governing rules commenced in 681 under Emperor Tenmu, is promulgated in Japan.

 By topic 

 Religion 
 Cædwalla of Wessex arrives in Rome and is baptised by pope Sergius I, taking the name Peter. He dies 10 days later and is buried at St. Peter's Basilica.
 Prince Oswald, brother of King Osric of  Hwicce, founds Pershore Abbey in Worcestershire (approximate date).

Births 
 Othmar, Swiss abbot (approximate date) 
 Rōben, Japanese Buddhist monk (d. 773)

Deaths 
 April 20 – Cædwalla, king of Wessex
 July 8 – Kilian, Irish bishop (approximate date)
 May 10 – Kusakabe, Japanese prince (b. 662)
 September 10 – Guo Zhengyi, official of the Chinese Tang Dynasty
 Alahis, king (usurper) of the Lombards
 Colman, Irish missionary (approximate date)   
 Grimoald II, duke of Benevento (Italy)
 John III, Coptic Orthodox pope of Alexandria
 Liu Jingxian, official of the Tang Dynasty
 Totnan, Irish Franconian apostle

References

Sources 

 
 

 

da:680'erne#689